The Laurel Refinery is an petroleum refinery located in Laurel, Montana. The refinery is currently owned and operated by CHS Inc.

References

External links
 CHS website

Energy infrastructure in Montana
Buildings and structures in Yellowstone County, Montana
Oil refineries in the United States